Sampson Gideon (February 1699 – 17 October 1762) was a Sephardic Jewish banker who was active in 18th-century London. Gideon is most prominently known for his financing of the Hanoverian-Whig government's suppression of the Jacobite Rising of 1745, subsequently becoming a trusted "adviser of the Government" who supported the passage of the Jew Bill of 1753. Historian James Picciotto, in his book Sketches of Anglo-Jewish History (1875) described Gideon as the "Rothschild of his day" and the "pillar of state credit".

Background
Sampson Gideon was born at London Wall in the City of London, second son in five children of Rowland Gideon (né Rohiel Abudiente), who traded in the West Indies, and his second wife Esther de Porto (also Jewish), daughter of Domingo (or Abraham) do Porto, a diamond buyer in Madras, India.  Sampson Gideon's paternal grandfather Moses Abudiente was a Sephardi born at Lisbon, Portugal, but moved to Glückstadt at Holstein an area close to Hamburg, where Rowland Gideon was born. The Abudientes (including Rowland and his brother) were active as part of the elite Sephardic planter ruling class in the West Indies, active in the production of sugar cane in first Barbados, Antigua and then Nevis (moving each time to avoid taxation). The Abudientes made their extensive fortune from the sugar cane, worked by the unfree labour of enslaved Africans and European indentured servants on their plantations.

After moving to London, Rowland Gideon was admitted to the Worshipful Company of Painter-Stainers on 17 February 1698 and was likely the first Jewish Freeman of the City of London. He was admitted to the company due to his Barbados trading connections, through the person of Samuel Swynock, one of the Wardens of the Painter-Stainers. Swynock had been close to Antonio Fernandez Carvajal, one of the Sephardic merchants allied to Oliver Cromwell and the Roundheads. Indeed, Carvajal founded the Creechuch Lane Synagogue where Sampson Gideon's parents were married by Haham Aylion on 26 December 1693. Rowland Gideon himself was the Treasurer of Bevis Marks Synagogue in the year that it was founded. Sampson's siblings included an unknown half-brother who died at Nevis in 1684, as well as three sisters; Bara Abudiente, Sara Abudiente and Rahel Abudiente. His brothers-in-law, married to the aforementioned sisters, included; Simson da Costa Athias (who was an investor on the London stock market), Jacob Lobatto and Moses Carriao de Paiba.

Finance
Gideon began his career at the age of 20 by speculating in coffee houses on lottery tickets, government securities, and the South Sea company. By the 1730s he was dealing in British, Dutch and French securities, as well as marine insurance. During the War of Austrian Succession (1740 to 1748) he broke through the anti-Semitic elements in financial circles in the City. He raised money in the Jewish community to help finance the British Army, and became a key advisor to the Pelhams and to the Bank of England on matters of high finance. His capital rose from £1,500 in 1719, to £45,000 in 1740, £180,000 in 1750, and £350,000 in 1759.

Gideon began business in 1720 with a capital of £1,500 (worth £276,100 in 2019) inherited from his family, which increased so rapidly that in 1729 he was admitted a sworn broker with a capital of £25,000 (worth £6,670,000 in 2019). Gideon was involved in financial activities as a broker, a middle-man in the metal trade with the East India Company. He was one of a number of contemporary Sephardic financiers in British public life who specialised in metal brokering, along with Abraham Mocatta. The Swedish Hats-government (controlled by pro-Jacobite freemasons) had invited Sephardic Jews in Britain to join the Swedish East India Company, which also included a number of Scotsmen who were members of the Masonic Lodges. The British government thus encouraged pro-Hanoverian freemason Joseph Salvador and Sampson Gideon to entice influential Scots to join the East India Company to undermine the Swedish-based Jacobite masonry.

Sampson Gideon was able to successfully navigate the South Sea Company bubble, which bankrupted many prominent people in Britain (indeed, James Picciotto in his Sketches of Anglo-Jewish History states that no "Hebrew" name is to be found on the list of insolvencies). Gideon offered his services, both private and political, to Robert Walpole and his ruling Whiggish government under the new Hanoverian monarchy. The first major conflict that he helped to financed was the War of Jenkins' Ear, against Spain. The Spanish Inquisition was still active and many of the Sephardi traders in the West Indies consequently viewed the Spanish cause in the conflict as potentially threatening to their trade interests.

Gideon's most significant historical act came during the Jacobite rising of 1745 during the War of the Austrian Succession when he provided assistance to the sitting Whig-Hanoverian regime against Charles Edward Stuart (the Young Pretender) and the Jacobites who were attempting to restore the Stuart monarchy, with the help of their Bourbon French allies. When the Young Pretender landed on the west-coast of Scotland in July 1745, there was panic in London as most of the British Army was engaged on the European Continent at the time. Consequently, there was a run on the banks (this was especially problematic for the Bank of England). This hit the finances of the Whiggish government hard under the Pelham Ministry. Rumours abounded among the common people that the Duke of Newcastle, the Secretary of State, had fled the country (he was forced to appear publicly outside of Newcastle House). When many were selling, Gideon calmly purchased as many government securities as he could at rock bottom prices and backed up the Bank of England. Gideon advised the government in the issuing of a loan, taking a significant chunk himself. This stabilised the situation and by the time that the Jacobite advance into England had halted before it reached London and the momentum switched as they were now in retreat back to Scotland, Gideon had doubled his wealth. The Whiggish political class under the Pelhams and the Hanoverian monarchy reigned supreme and owed a significant part of their position to Gideon's calm actions and financial activities.

Politics
Gideon was ambitious and wished to found a dynasty with vast landed estate interests in England (as the Rothschild family would go on to successfully achieve in the next century). However, it was not entirely clear whether Jews could legally own property in England. Jews had gradually began to resettle in England during the times of Cromwell, having been barred from the country since the Edict of Expulsion at the close of the 13th century. In the previous century, Gideon's fellow Sephardi, Antonio Fernandez Carvajal, had become the first endenizened Jew. However, following the English Reformation, those who did not conform to the Church of England (including English Dissenters and Catholics, as well as Jews) could not hold office, be called to the bar, obtain a naval commission, study for a university degree or vote in elections. There were additional commercial restrictions on endenizened Jews and they had to have the approval of the British parliament to own real estate. As Sampson Gideon and Joseph Salvador had provided a useful service to the Hanoverian-Whiggish regime against their rivals, they were confident enough to lobby Henry Pelham to introduce the Jewish Naturalisation Act 1753 to Parliament. Jews and Dissenters in British America had already achieved naturalisation with the Plantation Act 1740 (this was not extended to Catholics).

Death

Gideon died of dropsy at Belvedere House, near Erith, Kent, in October 1762, aged 63, having a gained a fortune recorded as £350,000 (equivalent to $ million in ).  He left £1000 to the Sephardi Jewish congregation in London on condition he was buried with honour as a married man in their cemetery in Mile End. (He did not marry a Jew, which under Jewish law precludes recognition as a married man). In 2005, the Bexley Civic Society restored a memorial to Sampson Gideon, located in the grounds of All Saints Church, Belvedere, and produced a plaque bearing a brief history of his life. The plaque reads, "This memorial commemorates the life of Sampson Gideon (1699–1762) sometime owner of Belvedere House, and father of Lord Eardley. A financier of nationwide renown, he is believed to have been a founder of the London Stock Exchange. Such was his reputation that the British government resorted both to his wealth and advice to underwrite the national debt, and finance the army during the Jacobite Rebellion of 1745 and the Seven Years' War of 1756–63. Amongst his descendants can be numbered Hugh Childers, Gladstone's Chancellor in his 1880–1885 ministry and Erskine Childers, Irish patriot and author of 'The Riddle of the Sands'. Another descendant Sir Culling Eardley was responsible for the building of this church".

Personal life

In the 1740s, he married Jane Ermell (died 1778), the daughter of Charles Ermell, with whom he had three children. His son, Sampson Gideon "Eardley" was educated at Eton College, was created a Baronet in 1759 and Baron Eardley of Spalding in 1789.  The elder Sampson had lobbied for a baronetcy for himself from the then Prime Minister, the Duke of Newcastle, but was denied it on account of his own religion, as he remained a practising Jew.  His son and two daughters, on the contrary, whose mother was Christian, were baptised and brought up in the Church of England. The government eventually conferred a baronetcy on his son

Gideon’s family and relatives:

Sampson Eardley, 1st Baron Eardley (10 October 1744 – 25 December 1824), married Maria Wilmot, had issue.
 Susanna Gideon (born June 1731), unmarried
 Elizabeth Gideon (died 1 July 1783), married William Gage, 2nd Viscount Gage, no issue
 George Seymour Eardley, 2nd Baron Eardley (April 1778 – 1833) living to the age of 55 before dying at his home Belvedere House, Kent
 Edwin Seymour Eardley, 3rd Baron Eardley (February 1811 – 1898) Edwin sold the family estate for a staggering (£1.25 million  or is equal to £85 million by 2020 standards
 Christopher Seymour Eardley, 4th Baron Eardley (March 1846 – 1901), unmarried yet the father of a bastard son who went onto inherit the family’s fortune
 Magnus Seymour Eardley, 5th Baron Eardley (July 1889 – 1931), he never accepted the fact that his late Father showed very little love towards him as he was born a bastard. He later reinstated his surname to Cohen, his family’s original surname from Jewish decent. Therefore making him Baron Magnus Seymour Cohen the 5th
 Anne Seymour Cohen (1902–1921), dying of common influenza
 Baron Henry Seymour Cohen (June 1914 – 1966), a powerful young man with an inheritance of around (£22 million in the 1921 or equal to £400 million by 2020 standards), he did well in investing his money in various enterprises and artefacts (he died in 1966 with a net worth of £92 million or around £1.2 billion by 2020 standards), to his son and next of kin Jeffrey
 Paul Seymour Cohen (born 1949), brother of Baron Jeffrey
 Baron Jeffrey Seymour Cohen (born November 1946), a founder of Lapada with a ridiculous collection of artefacts such as art, jewels and furniture although his net worth is yet to be disclosed it is assumed to be almost tenfold the amount in which he inherited, or around £1 billion. He is the current Baron Cohen and his next of kin is to be decided.
 Lisette Baron Cohen (December 1974 – 2009), dying at the age of 35 from cancer, she was the mother to Lila Mai Caldwell and master Milton Baron Morris the youngest and only male heir of the family apart from Nickolas who remains unmarried
 Nickolas Baron Cohen (born August 1978), unmarried/presumed (no news of new marriage registry under this name)
 Samara Baron Streeten (born July 1976), married to Rodger Streeten a famous designer with a large property portfolio
 Lila Mai Caldwell (born March 1999), daughter of the late Lisette Baron Cohen 
 Olivia Baron Streeten (born April 2000), daughter of Samara Baron Streeten
 Saffron Baron Streeten (born August 2002), daughter of Samara Baron Streeten – she, at the young age of 19, has already begun a career in painting.
 Milton Baron Morris (born October 2003), son of the late Lisette Baron Cohen
 Indigo Baron Streeten (born January 2005), daughter of Samara Baron Streeten

See also

History of the Jews in England

References

Bibliography

 
 
 
 
 
 Williams, E. N. "'Our Merchants Are Princes': The English Middle Classes in the Eighteenth Century," History Today (Aug 1962) 12#8 pp 548–557

1699 births
1762 deaths
British Jews
British bankers
People from the City of London
Deaths from edema
English people of Portuguese-Jewish descent
People of the Jacobite rising of 1745
Whig (British political party) politicians
Jewish bankers